The Centers for Medicare & Medicaid Services (CMS), is a federal agency within the United States Department of Health and Human Services (HHS) that administers the Medicare program and works in partnership with state governments to administer Medicaid, the Children's Health Insurance Program (CHIP), and health insurance portability standards. In addition to these programs, CMS has other responsibilities, including the administrative simplification standards from the Health Insurance Portability and Accountability Act of 1996 (HIPAA), quality standards in long-term care facilities (more commonly referred to as nursing homes) through its survey and certification process, clinical laboratory quality standards under the Clinical Laboratory Improvement Amendments, and oversight of HealthCare.gov.
CMS was previously known as the Health Care Financing Administration (HCFA) until 2001.

CMS actively inspects and reports on every nursing home in the United States.  This includes maintaining the 5-Star Quality Rating System.

History
Originally, the name "Medicare" in the United States referred to a program providing medical care for families of people serving in the military as part of the Dependents' Medical Care Act, which was passed in 1956. President Dwight D. Eisenhower held the first White House Conference on Aging in January 1961, in which creating a health care program for social security beneficiaries was proposed.

President Lyndon B. Johnson signed the Social Security Amendments on July 30, 1965, establishing both Medicare and Medicaid. Arthur E. Hess, a deputy commissioner of the Social Security Administration, was named as first director of the Bureau of Health Insurance in 1965, placing him as the first executive in charge of the Medicare program. At the time, the program provided health insurance to 19 million Americans. The Social Security Administration (SSA) became responsible for the administration of Medicare and the Social and Rehabilitation Service (SRS) became responsible for the administration of Medicaid. Both agencies were organized under what was then known as the Department of Health, Education, and Welfare (HEW).

In March 1977, the Health Care Financing Administration (HCFA) was established under HEW. HCFA became responsible for the coordination of Medicare and Medicaid. The responsibility for enrolling beneficiaries into Medicare and processing premium payments remained with SSA.

HCFA was renamed the Centers for Medicare and Medicaid Services on July 1, 2001.

In 2013, a report by the inspector general found that CMS had paid $23 million in benefits to deceased beneficiaries in 2011.

In April 2014, CMS released raw claims data from 2012 that gave a look into what types of doctors billed Medicare the most. 

In January 2018, CMS released guidelines for states to use to require Medicaid beneficiaries to continue receiving coverage. These guidelines came in response to then-President Trump's announcement that he would allow states to impose work requirements in Medicaid. In October, CMS reported a data breach of 75,000 people's personal data due to a hack.

In January 2021, CMS passed a rule that would cover "breakthrough technology" for four years after they received FDA approval. In September 2021, CMS submitted a proposal to repeal the rule based on safety concerns.

Workforce
CMS employs over 6,000 people, of whom about 4,000 are located at its headquarters in Woodlawn, Maryland. The remaining employees are located in the Hubert H. Humphrey Building in Washington, D.C., the 10 regional offices listed below, and in various field offices located throughout the United States.

The head of CMS is the Administrator of the Centers for Medicare & Medicaid Services. The position is appointed by the president and confirmed by the Senate. On May 27, 2021, Chiquita Brooks-LaSure was sworn in as Administrator, the first black woman to serve in the role.

Regional offices
CMS has its headquarters in Woodlawn, Maryland, with 10 regional offices located throughout the United States:

 Region I  – Boston, Massachusetts
Connecticut, Massachusetts, Maine, New Hampshire, Rhode Island and Vermont
 Region II  – New York, New York
New York State, New Jersey, U.S. Virgin Islands and Puerto Rico
 Region III  – Philadelphia, Pennsylvania
Delaware, Maryland, Pennsylvania, Virginia, West Virginia and the District of Columbia
 Region IV  – Atlanta, Georgia
Alabama, Florida, Georgia, Kentucky, Mississippi, North Carolina, South Carolina and Tennessee
 Region V  – Chicago, Illinois
Illinois, Indiana, Michigan, Minnesota, Ohio and Wisconsin

 Region VI  – Dallas, Texas
Arkansas, Louisiana, New Mexico, Oklahoma and Texas
 Region VII  – Kansas City, Missouri
Iowa, Kansas, Missouri, and Nebraska
 Region VIII  – Denver, Colorado
Colorado, Montana, North Dakota, South Dakota, Utah, and Wyoming
 Region IX  – San Francisco, California
Arizona, California, Hawaii, Nevada, American Samoa, Guam, and the Northern Mariana Islands
 Region X  – Seattle, Washington
Alaska, Idaho, Oregon, and Washington

List of administrators

See also
 Center for Medicare and Medicaid Innovation
 Zone Program Integrity Contractor

References
[2]Robinson, P. I. (1957). Medicare: Uniformed Services Program for Dependents. Social Security Bulletin, 20(7), 9–16.

External links
 
 Centers for Medicare and Medicaid Services in the Federal Register
 Health Care Financing Administration in the Federal Register
 Centers for Medicare & Medicaid Services reports and recommendations from the Government Accountability Office
 Grants to States for Medicaid account on USAspending.gov
 Centers for Medicare and Medicaid Innovation account on USAspending.gov
 State Grants and Demonstration account on USAspending.gov

Medicare and Medicaid (United States)
United States Department of Health and Human Services agencies
Woodlawn, Baltimore County, Maryland
Government agencies established in 1965
1965 establishments in the United States